Dr. Sai Hsai Kyauk Sam  (born 22 October 1951) is a Burmese politician who currently serves as a House of Nationalities member of parliament for Shan State № 6 constituency.

In the 2010 Myanmar general election, he was elected as an Amyotha Hluttaw MP and elected representative from Shan State № 6 parliamentary constituency.

Early life and education
He was born on 22 October 1951 in Keng Tung, Shan State, Burma(Myanmar) and graduated with B.V.S. and Dip in French from Yangon. His previous job was Amyotha Hluttaw MP.

Political career
He is a member of the Union Solidarity and Development Party. In the Myanmar general election, 2015, he was elected as an Amyotha Hluttaw MP, winning a majority of 34926 votes and elected representative from Shan State № 6 parliamentary constituency  .

References

Union Solidarity and Development Party politicians
1951 births
Living people
People from Shan State